In enzymology, a phosphoglucan, water dikinase is an enzyme that catalyzes the chemical reaction

ATP + [phospho-alpha-glucan] + H2O  AMP + O-phospho-[phospho-alpha-glucan] + phosphate

The 3 substrates of this enzyme are ATP, phospho-alpha-glucan, and H2O, whereas its 3 products are AMP, [[O-phospho-[phospho-alpha-glucan]]], and phosphate.

This enzyme belongs to the family of transferases, to be specific, those transferring phosphorus-containing groups (phosphotransferases) with paired acceptors (dikinases). The systematic name of this enzyme class is ATP:phospho-alpha-glucan, water phosphotransferase. Other names in common use include PWD, and OK1.

References

 
 

EC 2.7.9
Enzymes of unknown structure